Emmen is a municipality and town of the province of Drenthe in the northeastern Netherlands.

History 

A planned city, Emmen arose from several small farming and peat-harvesting communities which have dotted the province of Drenthe since the Middle Ages. Traces of these communities can still be seen in the form of the villages of Westenesch, Noordbarge and Zuidbarge: they have a separate history and layout but are surrounded by the suburbs and the center of Emmen.

The expansion of the town did not happen until after the Second World War. Suburbs were built around the old center of Emmen, starting with Emmermeer directly to the north, and followed to the south-east by Angelslo (for which an old village of the same name was demolished), Emmerhout (famed at the time for being separated from the town by an existing forest) to the east, Bargeres, the Rietlanden and Parc Sandur to the south and south-west. Construction of the last suburb, called Delftlanden, is well underway with many homes already built and people living in the area.

There are few historic landmarks left within the town, but those few include the church on the market square, where a church has been standing since the Middle Ages, the court of law building, dating from the beginning of the twentieth century, and the post office from the same time.  In the town's environs, an earthwork by Robert Smithson, "Broken Circle/Spiral Hill", may be found.

In 1957 it hosted the 1st Women's Chess Olympiad.

The prime economic booster since the 1980s has been the zoo, the Dierenpark Emmen. Begun in the 1930s, it was almost completely redesigned in the 1970s and is now co-owned by the municipality of Emmen. It attracts over 1.5 million visitors per year. It was replaced by Wildlands in 2016, when the old zoo closed. Important industries include Teijin Aramid, DSM Engineering Plastics, Wellman and Diolen Industrial Fibers (currently Senbis Polymer Innovations). There are extensive glasshouse complexes for horticulture, especially in the Klazienaveen-Erica area.  The municipality offers some 38,000 jobs.

Emmen is the most populous urban area of Drenthe. The municipality of Emmen is one of the largest in the Netherlands, although the area outside the town borders of Emmen is rather rural. The other villages of importance are Emmer-Compascuum, Klazienaveen, Nieuw-Amsterdam and Schoonebeek.

Geography 

The population centres:

 Barger-Compascuum
 Emmen
 Emmer-Compascuum
 Erica
 Klazienaveen
 Nieuw-Amsterdam
 Nieuw-Dordrecht
 Nieuw-Schoonebeek
 Nieuw-Weerdinge
 Roswinkel
 Schoonebeek
 Veenoord
 Weiteveen
 Zwartemeer

Demography 
The municipality of Emmen has some 107,000 inhabitants, with 56,000 living in the city of Emmen. Compared to some 3,000 inhabitants in the nineteenth century, this illustrates Emmen's rapid growth in the past 150 years.

Sports
The town's football club FC Emmen plays their home games in De Oude Meerdijk. They play in the Eredivisie.

Every year a big cycle racing criterium called Gouden Pijl,  where all the big names in bicycle sport come to Emmen for this event. Besides the bicycle race itself, the Gouden Pijl also includes cultural events like pop-concerts, etc. In 2008, the comeback concert of The Schizo's, the infamous local punk-band from the 1980s, was organized during the Gouden Pijl.

Speedway Emmen hosts regular Stock Car and Banger Racing.

Attractions 
Attractions in Emmen are Wildlands Adventure Zoo Emmen, the inner city, the natural environment and the Rensenpark (with among others the Museum of Contemporary Tibetan Art). There is also Museum Collectie Brands in the adjacent village of Nieuw-Dordrecht.

Transportation 
Emmen is served by one train connection with Zwolle, which in turn leads to the rest of the country.
Emmen railway station
Emmen Zuid railway station
Nieuw Amsterdam railway station

In addition, there are regular and frequent bus lines within Emmen and towards Groningen, Hoogeveen and Assen, as well as the surrounding countryside, and Meppen in Germany, departing from Emmen's two bus terminals.

By car, the town is accessible via the N34 from Ommen via Hardenberg and Coevorden towards Emmen, ending at the A28 motorway (Netherlands) towards Groningen near de Punt, the N381 to Drachten, the N391 to Veendam which goes through Emmen (with access to almost every district) and the A37 from Hoogeveen to Meppen in Germany, although this motorway is not directly next to Emmen. From the A37 to Emmen, there are three possibilities: at Junction Holsloot (A37 x N34), at Highway-exit Schoonebeek (A37 x N853), and Highway-exit Klazienaveen (A37 x N862). The A37 is also the quickest way towards the Randstad from Emmen. The A37 ends at the German border, where it continues as the B402 or European route E233.

The nearest airport is Groningen Airport Eelde at a distance of 50 kilometers.

Furthermore, there are inland shipping connections via Nieuw-Amsterdam to Coevorden, Hoogeveen and Almelo.

Notable people 

 Jaap Doek (born 1942), jurist specializing in family and juvenile law;  chairperson of the UN Committee on the Rights of the Child 2001 to 2007  
 Hanja Maij-Weggen (born 1943), retired politician
 Ben Feringa (born 1951), synthetic organic chemist specializing in molecular nanotechnology and homogenous catalysis
 Jans Aasman (born 1958), psychologist and Cognitive Science expert
 Maruschka Detmers (born 1962), actress
 Frank Westerman (born 1964), writer and former journalist
 Anne Vanschothorst (born 1974),  harpist and composer

Sport 
 Dries van der Lof (1919–1990), racing driver
 Jan de Jonge (born 1963), retired football striker, 410 caps
 Erik Regtop (born 1968), retired footballer, 387 caps
 Gerald Sibon (born 1974), retired footballer, 437 caps

References

External links 

 
 

 
Municipalities of Drenthe